Intravenous cholangiography is a form of cholangiography that was introduced in 1954.

Overview
The intravenous cholangiogram or IVC is a radiologic (x-ray) procedure that is used primarily to look at the larger bile ducts within the liver and the bile ducts outside the liver. The procedure can be used to locate gallstones within these bile ducts. IVC also can be used to identify other causes of obstruction to the flow of bile, for example, narrowings (strictures) of the bile ducts and cancers that may impair the normal flow of bile.

Procedure
To do an IVC, an iodine-containing dye (meglumine ioglycamate)  is injected intravenously into the blood. The liver then removes the dye from the blood and excretes it into the bile. The iodine is sufficiently concentrated as it is secreted into the bile that it does not need to be further concentrated by the gallbladder to outline the bile ducts and any gallstones that may be there. The gallbladder is not always seen on an IVC, as the iodine-containing bile may bypass the gallbladder entirely and empty directly into the small intestine.

Risks
Occasional serious allergic reactions can occur to any iodine-containing dye. These reactions can usually be treated and rarely result in death.

Indications
The IVC is not used as much today as it was. Its use always was limited, because it did not work when there was more than a minimal amount of jaundice, and many of the conditions it was used to detect also caused substantial jaundice. The IVC has been largely replaced by other diagnostic procedures—by ERCP (endoscopic retrograde cholangiopancreatography), endoscopic ultrasound and, increasingly, by MRI cholangiography, none of which are affected by jaundice. It is sometimes used when ERCP is unsuccessful.

References

Projectional radiography
Hepatology
Digestive system imaging